Mpudi Decca was a Congo music recording artist and guitarist in the Democratic Republic of the Congo (DRC). He was once a member of the Congo music band TPOK Jazz, led by François Luambo Makiadi, which dominated the Congolese music scene from the 1950s through the 1980s.

See also
 Franco Luambo Makiadi
 Sam Mangwana
 Josky Kiambukuta
 Simaro Lutumba
 Ndombe Opetum
 Youlou Mabiala
 Mose Fan Fan
 Wuta Mayi
 TPOK Jazz
 List of African musicians

References

Democratic Republic of the Congo musicians
TPOK Jazz members
Democratic Republic of the Congo guitarists